Pimelea pendens is a species of flowering plant in the family Thymelaeaceae and is endemic to the southwest of Western Australia. It is an erect, spindly shrub with egg-shaped to narrowly elliptic leaves and compact, pendulous clusters of pale green flowers surrounded by 2 to 4 pairs of green or yellowish-green involucral bracts.

Description
The stamens are slightly longer than the sepals and the style extends  beyond the end of the flower tube. Flowering occurs from May to August.

Taxonomy
Pimelea pendens was first formally described in 1988 by Barbara Lynette Rye and the description was published in the journal Nuytsia from specimens collected east of Esperance in 1983. The specific epithet (pendens) means "hanging down", referring to the flower clusters.

Distribution and habitat
This pimelea grows on scree slopes and on road verges near woodlands along the coast of southern Western Australia between Frenchman  Peak in Cape Le Grand National Park and Mount Arid in Cape Arid National Park, and as far inland as Mount Ney north of Esperance, in the Esperance Plains and Mallee bioregions of south-western Western Australia.

Conservation status
Pimelea pendens is listed as "not threatened" by the Western Australian Government Department of Biodiversity, Conservation and Attractions.

References

pendens
Malvales of Australia
Flora of Western Australia
Plants described in 1988
Taxa named by Barbara Lynette Rye